WorldatWork is a global association for human resources management professionals and business leaders focused on attracting, motivating, and retaining employees. WorldatWork works to promote the role of human resources as a profession, offering training and certification in compensation, benefits, work-life, and total rewards. Founded in 1955 and known for most of its history as the American Compensation Association.

The headquarters office is in Scottsdale, Arizona. WorldatWork also has an office in Washington, D.C.

WorldatWork's organization includes the following affiliates: WorldatWork Society of Certified Professionals and WorldatWork's Alliance for Work-Life Progress.

Membership
There are no prerequisites to membership at WorldatWork. Initiatory membership fees total $350 for practitioners and consultants, $125 for academic faculty, and $55 for students.

Certifications
WorldatWork certifications include Certified Compensation Professional (CCP), Certified Benefits Professional (CBP), Global Remuneration Professional (GRP), and Work-Life Certified Professional (WLCP)--all earned by passing pertinent exams. In 2010, WorldatWork introduced two new competency-based designations: the Certified Executive Compensation Professional (CECP) and the Certified Sales Compensation Professional (CSCP).

See also
 List of human resource management associations

References

External links
 WorldatWork Web Site

Human resource management associations
Professional associations based in the United States
Organizations established in 1955
1955 establishments in Arizona